The Tomb of Benei Hezir, previously known as the Tomb of Saint James, is the oldest of four monumental rock-cut tombs that stand in the Kidron Valley, adjacent to the Tomb of Zechariah and a few meters from the Tomb of Absalom. It dates to the period of the Second Temple. It is a complex of burial caves. The tomb was originally accessed from a single rock-cut stairwell which descends to the tomb from the north. At a later period an additional entrance was created by quarrying a tunnel from the courtyard of the monument known as "the Tomb of Zechariah". This is also the contemporary entrance to the burial complex.

Architecture

The facade of the tomb is a classical distyle in antis with two pillars between two pilasters above which there is undecorated architrave containing an engraved a Hebrew inscription.  Above the architrave is a Doric frieze and a cornice. The tomb's architectural style is influenced by ancient Greek architecture (two pillars with Doric capitals) as well as Nabataean influence in architecture and decorative elements (Nabataeanising was fashionable among some Judaean families), without ancient Egyptian architectural influences.

History

The tomb dates to the second century BCE, the Hellenistic period and the time of the Hasmonean monarchy in Jewish history. Architecturally the so-called Tomb of Zechariah postdates the complex, and the Tomb of Absalom is considered to have been erected even later. The tomb is effectively a burial cave dug into the cliff. It contains a Hebrew inscription, which makes it clear that this was the burial site of a priestly family called Benei Hezir, lit. "sons [descendants] of Hezir". The inscription reads:

זה הקבר והנפש שלאלעזר חניה יועזר יהודה שמעון יוחנן בני יוסף בן עובד יוסף ואלעזר בני חניה כהנים מבני חזיר — This is the grave and the Nefesh (burial monument) of Eliezer Hania Yoazar Yehuda Shimon Yochanan Benei (sons of) Yosef Ben (son of) Oved Yosef and Elazar Benei (sons of) Hania, Kohanim of the Hezir family.

Name

The name Hezir appears twice in the Bible (see below). The inscription on the monument mentions the "sons of Hezir", meaning: the descendants of Hezir. The Hebrew term is bnei Hezir, usually written in English as Benei Hazir. The common misspelling Hazir is clearly wrong, since that means pig in Hebrew.

In the 19th century Westerners still identified the monument with the tomb of St. James the Apostle.

Benei Hezir family
The tomb's inscription reveals that the cave was used by several generations of the Benei Hezir family.  As well, it indicates that this was a wealthy family, able to afford a burial cave in the Kidron Valley.  In the Hebrew Bible there are two mentions of men with the name of Hezir. One was the founder of the 17th priestly division; the other one was among the leaders who set their seal to the covenant with Nehemiah. It is not known if there is a relation between the family buried here and the biblical Hezirs.

Nefesh
The inscription mentions a nefesh (נפש : literally meaning soul), which is also a designation for a magnificent structure built on or alongside the tomb. It has been proposed that the Tomb of Zechariah, a solid rock-hewn object which stands by the entrance, and is thought to date from a similar period to the inscription, is actually this nefesh. Another option is that the additional facade to the north of the Doric dystilos-in-antis was the original nefesh. Although it did not survive it is possible to reconstruct the upper part of the above-mentioned facade as a Nabataean tower with a decorative door and window, similar monuments can be seen in Petra.

See also
Rock-cut tombs in ancient Israel

References

Archaeological sites in Jerusalem
Jewish mausoleums
Mount of Olives
Rock-cut tombs
Tombs in the State of Palestine